"Shandi" is a hit single by American hard rock band Kiss. Released on their 1980 album, Unmasked, the song was popular in Australia, where it reached number five on the Australian charts. The song would prove to be a hit in other countries as well, making the top ten in three other countries. "Shandi" peaked at number 47 on the U.S. Billboard Hot 100 Chart.

Written by vocalist/guitarist Paul Stanley and producer Vini Poncia, the song was inspired by the Hollies cover of the Bruce Springsteen song "4th of July, Asbury Park (Sandy)".

The song is performed solo by Stanley on guitar when the band is touring in Australia and New Zealand. The song was also played by Kiss with the Melbourne Symphony Ensemble for the Kiss Symphony: Alive IV performance and subsequent album in 2003.

An Eric Carr-sung version appears on his second posthumous album, Unfinished Business.

Reception
Cash Box said that with "arching strings and guitar glissandos," Kiss acts as "closet crooners" rather than producing "fiery heavy metal [or[ pounding rock disco." Record World said that "A sweltering lyrical guitar gives Paul Stanley's passionate lead vocal an appropriate introduction."

Music video
A promotional video was made for the song, which proved to be the final appearance of Peter Criss with the band before he left to pursue a solo career in 1980. Although all four original band members appear in the video, only Paul Stanley and Ace Frehley were involved in the recording of the track. Session drummer Anton Fig plays drums, Kiss roadie Tom Harper plays bass and professional songwriter Holly Knight plays keyboards, while Stanley sings lead vocals and plays lead guitar, and Frehley plays acoustic  guitars. Vini Poncia provided backing vocals to the track.

In the video, a woman stalks the band from outside their dressing room, anxious to see them without their makeup. After their concert, they return to their dressing room to change to their street clothes. Upon exiting the room, the woman calls them out; they turn around, revealing that they still have their makeup on.

Chart performance

Weekly charts

Year-end charts

Personnel
Paul Stanley – lead vocals, lead guitar
Ace Frehley – acoustic guitar, backing vocals 
Anton Fig – drums
Tom Harper – bass
Holly Knight – keyboards
Vini Poncia – backing vocals

References

Kiss (band) songs
1980 singles
Songs written by Vini Poncia
Songs written by Paul Stanley
Casablanca Records singles
1980 songs
American soft rock songs
Number-one singles in Argentina